Isabella Losa, also known as Isabella Losa of Cordova or Losa de Cordova (1491-1564) was a doctor of theology and nun.

Isabella Losa was known for her knowledge of Greek, Latin, and Hebrew.  She received the degree of Doctor of Divinity from the University of Cordova.  After the death of her husband in 1539, she became a Clarissan abbess and moved to Vercelli in Piedmont in 1553, where she founded an orphanage, Santa Maria di Loreto. She died in 1564 at age 74.

Isabella Losa's name was included in the Heritage Floor of artist Judy Chicago's work The Dinner Party.

See also
 Beatriz Galindo
 Francisca de Lebrija
 Luisa de Medrano
 Juliana Morell

References

External links
Project Continua: Biography of Isabella Losa Project Continua is a web-based multimedia resource dedicated to the creation and preservation of women’s intellectual history from the earliest surviving evidence into the 21st Century.

1491 births
1564 deaths
16th-century Spanish women
Christian Hebraists
Poor Clares
16th-century Spanish people
Spanish Renaissance people
Renaissance women